Eslamabad (also Romanized as Eslāmābād) is a village in Bakesh-e Yek Rural District, in the Central District of Mamasani County, Fars Province, Iran. At the 2006 census, its population was 163, in 31 families.

References 

Populated places in Mamasani County